Suri Vidyasagar College, established in 1942, is a government affiliated college located at Suri in the Birbhum district of West Bengal. It is affiliated to University of Burdwan and teaches arts, science and commerce.
It was formerly affiliated with the University of Calcutta.

Departments

Science

Chemistry
Physics 
Mathematics
Botany
Zoology
Physiology
Microbiology
Plant Protection
Computer Science
Electronics
Economics

Arts and Commerce

Bengali
English
Sanskrit
History
Political Science
Philosophy
Economics 
Commerce
 Journalism and Mass Communication
Arabic
Geography

Notable alumni
Pranab Mukherjee, former President of India, former Finance Minister of India
Tulsi Giri, former Prime Minister of Nepal

Accreditation
The college is recognized by the University Grants Commission (UGC). It was accredited by the National Assessment and Accreditation Council (NAAC), and in 2016  awarded B++ grade, an accreditation that has since then expired.

See also

References

External links
Suri Vidyasagar College
Speech by the President of India at the felicitation function at Suri Vidyasagar College

Universities and colleges in Birbhum district
Colleges affiliated to University of Burdwan
Educational institutions established in 1942
1942 establishments in India